Geoffrey Gurrumul Yunupingu (22 January 1971 – 25 July 2017), commonly known as Gurrumul and also referred to since his death as Dr G. Yunupingu, was an Aboriginal Australian musician of the Yolŋu  peoples. A multi-instrumentalist, he played drums, keyboards, guitar (a right-hand-strung guitar played left-handed) and didgeridoo, but it was the clarity of his singing voice that attracted rave reviews. He sang stories of his land both in Yolŋu languages such as Gaalpu, Gumatj or Djambarrpuynu, a dialect related to Gumatj, and in English. Although his solo career brought him wider acclaim, he was also formerly a member of Yothu Yindi and later of Saltwater Band. He was the most commercially successful Aboriginal Australian musician at the time of his death. As of 2020, it is estimated that Yunupingu has sold half a million records globally.

Life and career

Early life (1971–1989)
When he was four years old, he taught himself how to play a toy piano and an accordion. A year later he began to play a guitar; despite being a left-hander, he played a right-handed guitar, holding it upside down, which he would continue to do throughout his career. His friend, spokesperson, and collaborator Michael Hohnen described his early musical experiences as follows: "Gurrumul was educated by immersion, cultural immersion—from his aunties, parents and grandmothers, with love and lullabies; from his uncles, fathers and grandfathers through ceremony songs and storytelling, much of it through music. Throughout his childhood, he was built, given or bought tin cans, sticks, toy keyboards, piano accordions, nylon string guitars, and, later, clap sticks (bilma) and didgeridoos (yidaki). He learned foot stomping calling and whooping, vocalisations of traditional songs and their different sounds, and so much more." He later sang hymns in the mission choir and also enjoyed Western pop music, particularly Dire Straits, Cliff Richard, and Stevie Wonder. An adventurous child, he was taught how to play basketball and ride a push-bike around his community. He left school at the age of 12, having attended his local school, Shepherdson College, along with a brief stint at an institute in the Victorian city of Geelong for instruction in Braille, which did not interest him.

Career (1989–2017)

In 1989, at the age of 18, Yunupingu joined Yothu Yindi as a multi-instrumentalist and backing vocalist, notably contributing to their 1991 album, Tribal Voice. He left the group in 1995 to live full-time on Elcho Island and later co-founded and co-led the Saltwater Band, which was active from 1999 to 2009. His first solo album, Gurrumul, was released in 2008, debuting at No. 69 on the ARIA Charts and No. 1 on the independent chart. Gurrumul peaked at No. 3 on the ARIA Charts. The album was certified triple platinum. Yunupingu's friend Michael Hohnen produced the album and was his translator, collaborator and confidant. Critics heaped praise on the singer, describing his voice as having "transcendental beauty". Elton John, Sting and Björk were among his fans. The money he made was largely shared with his family, following the Aboriginal tradition of sharing wealth. He did not generally give interviews, instead relying on Hohnen to speak for him, following a Yolŋu custom that dictated that Yunupingu's role was only to sing, while his elders spoke publicly. In a 2009 interview with him and Hohnen, Yunupingu said that he was generally shy but more comfortable playing music, and went on to say: "I don't have much to say to people when I talk. That is for other Yolŋu. But I can play and sing and tell people things through my songs. We have an encyclopedia of stories ready to tell people, if they want to listen."

In 2008 Yunupingu was nominated for four ARIA Awards, winning the awards for Best World Music Album and Best Independent Release. He also won three Deadlys, winning for Artist of the Year, Album of the Year for Gurrumul and Single of the Year for "Gurrumul History (I Was Born Blind)".

In November 2009, Yunupingu was named Best New Independent Artist and his album, Gurrumul, Best Independent Release and Best Independent Blues/Roots Release at the Australian Independent Record (AIR) Awards held at Melbourne's Corner Hotel. In 2009 a portrait of Yunupingu by Guy Maestri won Australia's major art prize, the Archibald Prize.

He was again awarded the Australian Independent Record (AIR) Award for Best Independent Blues and Roots Album in 2011 for his album Rrakala. At the ARIA Music Awards of 2011, he won Best World Music Album and performed "Warwu" featuring Missy Higgins on piano. In 2019, Double J's Dan Condon described it as one of "7 great performances from the history of the ARIA Awards."

In 2012, Yunupingu was one of the contributing vocalists on Gary Barlow's commemorative single "Sing" for Queen Elizabeth II's diamond jubilee celebrations, which features artists from across the Commonwealth. He performed "Sing" live at the Diamond Jubilee Concert on 4 June 2012 together with many of the song's contributing artists. In 2012, Yunupingu was conferred with an Honorary Doctorate of Music by the University of Sydney.

In 2013, Yunupingu joined Delta Goodrem for a special performance of "Bayini" on The Voice Australia. In December 2013, Yunupingu released a live album, titled His Life and Music, which was recorded in the Sydney Opera House and released through ABC Music. It was nominated for Australian Independent Record Labels Association and ARIA awards. "Bayini" became the first track by an indigenous musician to reach the top five of the Australian charts.

In 2015, Yunupingu toured the US. He released his third studio album, The Gospel Album, on 31 July 2015. It debuted at number 3 on the ARIA Charts. In October 2015, the album won Gurrumul's third ARIA Award for Best World Music Album.

In July 2016, Yunupingu featured on the A.B. Original track "Take Me Home".

Death (2017)
Yunupingu died at the Royal Darwin Hospital, Northern Territory, at about 5:00 pm on 25 July 2017, aged 46. He had lived with liver and kidney damage for many years due to hepatitis B which he had contracted in childhood. On his death he was described as an important figure in fostering racial harmony and as a voice of Indigenous Australians. He received tributes from the Australian prime minister, Malcolm Turnbull, fellow musician Peter Garrett, and Anna Reid, the dean of the Sydney Conservatorium of Music.

Posthumous releases and recognition (2018–present)
In April 2018, Yunupingu's fourth studio album, Djarimirri (Child of the Rainbow), was released. It was an album four years in the making and was completed by producer and arranger Michael Hohnen. A documentary film titled Gurrumul was also released, which Luke Buckmaster reviewed, stating that "For Gurrumul fans, the film is obviously a must-see. For those unfamiliar, or vaguely familiar with his work, it's an even greater treat: they will be entertained, enthralled, perhaps in some small way changed." The album won four ARIA Music Awards at the 2018 ceremony; his daughter Jasmin accepted the award for Best Male Artist on his behalf.

In November 2020, Decca Records announced they had signed to the rights to Yunupingu's catalogue and future recordings, announcing forthcoming releases, including limited-edition vinyls, a box set and collaborations among a slate of projects. In December 2020, Yunupingu was listed at number 33 in Rolling Stone Australias "50 Greatest Australian Artists of All Time" issue.

In September 2021, Yunupingu's first anthology was released, entitled The Gurrumul Story. In the same year, a species of frog from the Wessel Islands, Northern Territory, was named Uperoleia gurrumuli (Gurrumul's toadlet) in honour of Yunupingu.

Discography

Studio albums

Live albums

Compilation albums

Awards and nominations

AIR Awards
The Australian Independent Record Awards (commonly known informally as AIR Awards) is an annual awards night to recognise, promote and celebrate the success of Australia's Independent Music sector.

|-
| rowspan="3" | 2008
| himself 
| Best New Independent Album
| 
|-
| rowspan="2" | Gurrumul 
| Best Independent Album
| 
|-
| Best Independent Blues and Roots Album
| 
|-
| 2011
| Rrakala
| Best Independent Blues and Roots Album
| 
|-
| 2014
| His Life and Music
| Best Independent Classical Album
| 
|-
| 2015
| The Gospel Album
| Best Independent Blues and Roots Album
| 
|-
| rowspan="3" | 2019
| rowspan="2" |Djarimirri
| Best Independent Album/EP
| 
|-
| Best Independent Classical Album
| 
|-
| himself 
| Best Independent Artist
| 
|-

APRA Awards
The APRA Awards are presented annually from 1982 by the Australasian Performing Right Association (APRA), "honouring composers and songwriters".

|-
| 1991 || "Treaty" by Yothu Yindi (co-written by Geoffrey Gurrumul Yunupingu) || Song of the Year || 
|-
| 2009 || Geoffrey Gurrumul Yunupingu || Breakthrough Song Writer || 
|-
| 2014 || "Bayini" by Geoffrey Gurrumul Yunupingu (Rrawun D Maymuru) || Song of the Year || 
|-

ARIA Music Awards
The ARIA Music Awards is an annual awards ceremony that recognises excellence, innovation, and achievement across all genres of Australian music. Gurrumul has won 9 awards from 21 nominations.

|-
| rowspan="5"| 2008
| rowspan="4"| Gurrumul
| Best Independent Release
| 
|-
| Best World Music Album
| 
|-
| Best Male Artist
| 
|-
| Album of the Year
| 
|-
| Michael Hohnen and Geoffrey Gurrumul Yunupingu for Gurrumul
| Producer of the Year
|  
|-
| rowspan="6"| 2011
| rowspan="5"| Rrakala
| Best Independent Release
| 
|-
| Best World Music Album
| 
|-
| Best Male Artist
| 
|-
| Album of the Year
|  
|-
| Best Cover Art
| 
|-
| "Gopuru" (directed by Carlo Santone)
| Best Video
| 
|-
| rowspan="2"| 2014
| rowspan="2"| His Life and Music (with Sydney Symphony Orchestra)
| Best Male Artist
| 
|-
| Best Original Soundtrack/Cast/Show Album
| 
|-
| rowspan="1"| 2015
| rowspan="1"| The Gospel Album
| Best World Music Album
| 
|-
| rowspan="7"| 2018
| rowspan="5"| Djarimirri (Child of the Rainbow)
| Album of the Year
| 
|-
| Best Male Artist
| 
|-
| Best Independent Release
| 
|-
| Best World Music Album
| 
|-
| Best Cover Art
| 
|-
| Michael Hohnen for Djarimirri (Child of the Rainbow)
| Producer of the Year
| 
|-
| Ted Howard, Robin Mai & Matthew Cunliffe for Djarimirri (Child of the Rainbow)
| Engineer of the Year
| 
|-

Australian Music Prize
The Australian Music Prize (AMP) is an annual award of $30,000 given to an Australian band or solo artist in recognition of the merit of an album released during the year of award. The award commenced in 2005.

|-
| 2011
| Rrakala
| Australian Music Prize
| 
|-
| 2018
| Djarimirri
| Australian Music Prize
| 
|-

J Award
The J Awards are an annual series of Australian music awards that were established by the Australian Broadcasting Corporation's youth-focused radio station Triple J. They commenced in 2005.

|-
| J Awards of 2018
| himself
| Double J Artist of the Year
|

Helpmann Awards
The Helpmann Awards is an awards show, celebrating live entertainment and performing arts in Australia, presented by industry group Live Performance Australia since 2001. Note: 2020 and 2021 were cancelled due to the COVID-19 pandemic.
 

! 
|-
| 2009
| Geoffrey Gurrumul Yunupingu
| Helpmann Award for Best Australian Contemporary Concert
| 
| 
|-

National Indigenous Music Awards
The National Indigenous Music Awards recognise excellence, innovation and leadership among Aboriginal and Torres Strait Islander musicians from throughout Australia. It commenced in 2004.

|-
| 2005
| himself
| Male Artist of the Year
| 
|-
| rowspan="4"| 2008
| rowspan="2"| Gurrumul
| Album of the Year
| 
|-
| Cover Art of the Year
| 
|-
| "Wiyathul"
| Song of the Year 
| 
|-
| himself
| Artist of the Year 
| 
|-
| rowspan="3"| 2009
| rowspan="1"| Gurrumul
| Cover Art of the Year
| 
|-
| Gurrumul Geoffrey Yunupingu – "Bapa"
| DVD/ Film Clip of the Year
| 
|-
| himself
| Artist of the Year 
| 
|-
| rowspan="2"| 2010
| rowspan="1"| "History"
| Film Clip of the Year
| 
|-
| himself
| Artist of the Year 
| 
|-
| rowspan="6"| 2011
| rowspan="2"| Rrakala
| Album of the Year
| 
|-
| Cover Art of the Year
| 
|-
| "Mala Rrakala"
| rowspan="2"| Song of the year 
| 
|-
| rowspan="2"| "Gathu Mawula" (featuring Blue King Brown) 
| 
|-
| Film Clip of the year 
| 
|-
| himself
| Artist of the year 
| 
|-
| rowspan="3"| 2012
| rowspan="2"| "Bayini" (featuring Sarah Blasko)
| Cover Art of the Year
| 
|-
| Song of the Year
| 
|-
| himself
| Artist of the year 
| 
|-
| rowspan="4"| 2013
| himself
| Special Recognition Award 
| 
|-
| himself
| Artist of the Year 
| 
|-
| "Bayini" (live) - with Delta Goodrem
| rowspan="2"| Song of the Year
| 
|-
| "A Baru in New York" - with Yolanda Be Cool
| 
|-
| rowspan="3"| 2014
| himself
| Artist of the Year
| 
|-
| Album of the Year
| His Life and Music (with Sydney Symphony Orchestra)
| 
|-
| Song of the Year
| "Marilitja"
| 
|-
| rowspan="5"| 2016
| rowspan="2"| "The Children Came Back" Briggs and Dewayne Everettsmith (featuring Gurrumul)
| Song of the Year
| 
|-
| Film Clip of the Year
| 
|-
| himself
| Artist of the year 
| 
|-
| rowspan="2"| The Gospel Album
| Album of the Year
| 
|-
| Best Cover Art of the Year
| 
|-
| rowspan="3"| 2018
| Djarimirri (Child of the Rainbow)
| Album of the Year
| 
|-
| "Djarimirri (Child of the Rainbow)"
| Song of the Year
| 
|-
| himself
| Artist of the year 
| 
|-
| 2022
| Gurrumul
| Hall of Fame
| 
|-

Notes

References

External links

Record company bio
Video of Geoffrey Gurrumul Yunupingu performing at YouTube
National Indigenous Times – Issue 151 Yunupingu's voice creates waves throughout the world
Gurrumul obituary

1971 births
2017 deaths
APRA Award winners
ARIA Award winners
Australian male singers
Musicians from the Northern Territory
Blind musicians
Australian blind people
Deaths from hepatitis
Didgeridoo players
Indigenous Australian musicians
Yolngu people